Secret Svensson (Swedish:Hemliga Svensson) is a 1933 Swedish comedy film directed by Schamyl Bauman and starring Fridolf Rhudin, Weyler Hildebrand and Edvard Persson.

Cast
 Fridolf Rhudin as Fridolf Svensson  
 Weyler Hildebrand as Julius Göransson  
 Edvard Persson as August Olsson  
 Dagmar Ebbesen as Mrs. Jansson  
 Rut Holm as Stina Jansson  
 Emy Hagman as Eva Blomgren  
 Ragnar Widestedt as Levenius  
 Hugo Jacobsson as Nord  
 Ernst Fastbom as Man  
 Emil Fjellström as Tax Collector  
 Alma Bodén as Fridolf's mother 
 Märta Claesson as Mrs. Lindgren  
 Nils Dahlström as Bus driver  
 Erik Forslund as Man in line  
 Knut Frankman as Man in line  
 Lilly Kjellström as Maid  
 John Melin as café owner  
 Carl Reinholdz as Young man 
 Greta Tegnér as Waitress on boat

References

Bibliography 
 Qvist, Per Olov & von Bagh, Peter. Guide to the Cinema of Sweden and Finland. Greenwood Publishing Group, 2000.

External links 
 

1933 films
1933 comedy films
Swedish comedy films
1930s Swedish-language films
Films directed by Schamyl Bauman
Swedish black-and-white films
1930s Swedish films